The Aéro Services Guépard Guêpe (sometimes just called La Guêpe; English: Wasp) is a French ultralight aircraft, designed and produced by Aéro Services Guépard. The aircraft is supplied fully assembled.

Design and development
The aircraft was designed to comply with the Fédération Aéronautique Internationale microlight rules. It features a V-strut-braced high-wing, a two seats in tandem open cockpit, conventional landing gear and a single engine in pusher configuration.

The aircraft is made from bolted-together aluminum tubing, with a single tube serving as the keel tube. A small cockpit fairing and windshield are optional. Its  span wing has an aluminium structure with its flying surfaces covered in doped aircraft fabric. Standard engines available are the  Rotax 582 two-stroke and the  HKS 700E four-stroke powerplant.

Specifications (Guêpe)

References

External links

2010s French ultralight aircraft
Homebuilt aircraft
Single-engined pusher aircraft
Guépe